Fang-Fang Yin is a Chinese-born radiologist.

Yin earned a Bachelor of Science degree from Zhejiang University in 1982. He subsequently moved to the United States, completing a Master of Science degree at Bowling Green State University in 1987, followed by a doctorate at the University of Chicago in 1992. Yin teaches at Duke University, where he is affiliated with the Duke Cancer Institute, and was appointed the Gustavo S. Montana Professor of Radiation Oncology in 2021.

References

Chinese expatriates in the United States
Year of birth missing (living people)
Radiologists
Bowling Green State University alumni
Living people
Zhejiang University alumni
Duke University faculty
Chinese oncologists
University of Chicago alumni
20th-century Chinese scientists
21st-century Chinese scientists